The Coronation of Napoleon is a painting completed in 1807 by Jacques-Louis David, the official painter of Napoleon, depicting the coronation of Napoleon at Notre-Dame de Paris. The work is on display at the Louvre Museum in Paris.

History of the work
The work was commissioned by Napoleon orally in September 1804, and Jaques-Louis started work on it on 21 December 1805 in the former chapel of the College of Cluny, near the Sorbonne, which served as a workshop. Assisted by his student Georges Rouget, he put the finishing touches in January 1808.

From 7 February to 22 March 1808, the work was exhibited at the Salon annual painting display in 1808, and it was presented to the Salon decennial prize competition in 1810. The painting remained the property of David until 1819, when it was transferred to the Royal Museums, where it was stored in the reserves until 1837. Then, it was installed in the Chamber Sacre of the museum of the historical Palace of Versailles on the orders of King Louis-Philippe. In 1889, the painting was transferred to the Louvre from Versailles.

David was commissioned by American entrepreneurs to paint a full size replica, in 1808, immediately after the release of the original. He began work that year, painting it from memory, but didn't finish until 1822, during his exile in Brussels. The replica was eventually returned to France in 1947, to the original's place in the Palace of Versailles.

The painting is a subject of The Public Viewing David's 'Coronation' at the Louvre, a painting by Louis-Léopold Boilly done in 1810, currently housed at the Metropolitan Museum of Art.

Composition

The composition is organized around several axes, and incorporates the rules of neoclassicism. One axis is that which passes through the cross and has a vertical orientation. A diagonal line runs from the pope to the empress. All eyes are turned towards Napoleon, who is the center of the composition.

Characters

 Napoleon I (1769–1821), is standing, dressed in coronation robes similar to those of Roman emperors. Others are merely passive spectators. In the actual painting it is possible to see the outline of what was originally painted: Napoleon holding the crown above his own head, as if placing on himself.
 Joséphine de Beauharnais (1763–1814), is kneeling in a submissive position, as called for in the French Civil Code. She received the crown from the hands of her husband, not the pope. Her robe is decorated with silk according to a contemporary cartoon by Jean-Francois Bony.
 Maria Letizia Ramolino (1750–1836), mother of Napoleon, was placed in the stands by the painter. She occupies a place more important than the pope. Actually, she did not attend the ceremony to protest the friction of Napoleon with his brothers Lucien and Joseph. Maria Letizia asked the painter to give Lucien a place of honour. In 1808, when Napoleon discovered the canvas completed in the workshop of David, he was enthralled, and expressed his gratitude to the painter who had managed to convey to posterity the tribute paid to the affection he was carrying to a woman who shared with him the burden of his office.
 Louis Bonaparte (1778–1846), who at the beginning of the empire received the title of grand constable, King of Holland, in 1806. He married Hortense de Beauharnais, the daughter of Josephine.
 Joseph Bonaparte (1768–1844), who was not invited and did not attend because of an argument with Napoleon. This is why his mother did not attend either. After the coronation, he received the title of Prince Imperial. Then he was King of Naples in 1806 and Spain in 1808.
 The young Napoleon Charles Bonaparte (1802–1807), son of Louis Bonaparte and Hortense de Beauharnais.
 The sisters of Napoleon. In the replica, the dress of Napoleon's favorite sister will be pink. This is the only change in the replica despite being painted from memory.
 Charles-Francois Lebrun (1739–1824), the third consul alongside Napoleon and Cambacérès. Under the First Empire, he took the place of prince-architrésorier. He holds the sceptre.
 Jean Jacques Régis de Cambacérès (1753–1824), arch-chancellor prince of the empire. He takes the hand of justice.
 Louis-Alexandre Berthier (1753–1815), minister of war under the Consulate. Marshal of the Empire in 1805. He keeps the globe surmounted by a cross.
 Talleyrand (1754–1836), grand chamberlain since July 11, 1804.
 Joachim Murat (1767–1815), Marshal of the Empire, king of Naples after 1808, brother-in-law of Napoleon and husband of Caroline Bonaparte.
 Pope Pius VII (1742–1823), was content to bless the coronation. He is surrounded by dignitaries clerics, appointed by Napoleon since the Concordat. In order not to jeopardize the new balance between Church and State, the pope accepted to attend the coronation. The original sketches (as was typical in those days) showed the (key) subjects - including the Pope - minus their clothing, which was added in the actual painting. The pope was originally pictured with hands crossed on his lap, but Napoleon, supposedly claiming that the Pope was not present to do nothing, instructed that the painting depict him anointing the proceedings. 
 The painter Jacques-Louis David is depicted in the stands as well.
 Halet Efendi, an Ottoman ambassador, was also present. He is shown below in the detailed picture.
 Dom Raphaël de Monachis, Greek-Egyptian monk and member of the Institut d'Égypte is depicted among the clergy men, standing to the right of the Bishop, with a beard and a red hood.
 The lady robe bearer in front, right behind Josephine, on the right side from the picture-viewer's point, is Elisabeth-Hélène-Pierre de Montmorency-Laval, mother of politician Sosthènes II de La Rochefoucauld. She was a court lady of Josephine.

References

Bibliography
 Malika Dorbani-Bouabdellah, The largest French paintings in the Louvre
 Jean Tulard, Le Sacre de l'empereur Napoléon. Histoire et légende, Paris 2004

External links
 Louvre Museum's interactive closer look at The Coronation of Napoleon
 

1800s paintings
Neoclassical paintings
Paintings in the Louvre by French artists
Portrait paintings in the Louvre
Paintings by Jacques-Louis David
Paintings of Napoleon
Churches in art
Popes in art
Notre-Dame de Paris